Chrysoritis zonarius, the donkey daisy copper or Coetzer's daisy copper, is a butterfly of the family Lycaenidae. It is found in South Africa, along the coast and inland from the Cape Peninsula, north-west to Paleisheuwel and Lambert's Bay and along the hills to the Western Cape.

The wingspan is 18–22 mm for males and 20–24 mm for females. Adults are on wing from September to November. There is one generation per year.

The larvae feed on Chrysanthemoides incana. They are attended to by Crematogaster peringueyi ants.

Subspecies
Chrysoritis zonarius zonarius (South Africa: Western Cape)
Chrysoritis zonarius coetzeri Dickson & Wykeham, 1994 (South Africa: Northern Cape)

References

zona
Endemic butterflies of South Africa
Butterflies described in 1938
Taxa named by Norman Denbigh Riley